Football is a family of sports that involve kicking with the foot or carrying in the hands a ball to score points.

Football may specifically refer to:

Sports
 Association football (known as football in most of the world and soccer in North America and Oceania)
 Australian rules football
 Gaelic football
 Gridiron football (known as football in North America and gridiron in Australia and New Zealand)
 American football
 Canadian football
 International rules football
 Rugby football
 Rugby league
 Rugby union
 Football (ball), any of several types of balls used to play the football sports
 Ball (association football)
 Gaelic ball
 Ball (gridiron football)
 Rugby ball

Entertainment
 Football (board game), a game simulating association football
 "Football" (Drake & Josh), a television episode
 Football (film), a 1982 Indian Malayalam film
 Football (magazine), a Russian association football and ice hockey magazine
 Football (1978 video game), an American football arcade and Atari 2600 game
 NFL Football (video game), an American football game for Intellivision (1979) and the Atari 2600 (1982)

Other uses
 Football (word), an English-language word with various meanings and uses
 Football Mountain, an Antarctic mountain
 The Football (Antarctica), a bare rock scar on the mountain
 Nuclear football, or the football, a briefcase carrying a triggering device to allow the President of the United States to authorize a nuclear attack

See also
 
 
Ball (disambiguation)